Proby may refer to:

Proby baronets, an extinct title in the Baronetage of England and an extant one in the Baronetage of the United Kingdom
Douglas Proby (1856–1931), British politician and soldier
Glenda Proby, American rapper and songwriter known professionally as Gizzle
Granville Proby, 3rd Earl of Carysfort (1782–1868), British Royal Navy admiral and politician
Granville Proby, 4th Earl of Carysfort (1824–1872), British politician
Hugh Proby (1826–1852), founder of Kanyaka Station in South Australia; a son of the 3rd Earl of Carysfort
John Proby (disambiguation)
P.J. Proby (born James Marcus Smith, 1938), American singer, songwriter and actor
Sir Peter Proby, 2nd Baronet (1911–2002), bursar of Eton
Thomas Proby, 1st Baronet (1632–1689), English politician and Member of Parliament
William Proby, Lord Proby (1779–1804), British Royal Navy captain and politician
William Proby, 5th Earl of Carysfort (1836–1909)
Proby Cautley (1802–1871),  English engineer and palaeontologist best known for conceiving and supervising the construction of the Ganges canal in India